Wave Gods is the twentieth mixtape by American rapper French Montana, released on February 19, 2016. The mixtape features guest appearances from Future, Kanye West, Nas, Travis Scott, Big Sean, Chris Brown, Quavo, Belly, Kodak Black, Puff Daddy, Jadakiss, Chinx and ASAP Rocky. Production was handled by AK47, Ben Billions, Black Metaphor, DJ Khalil, Harry Fraud, Jayze, Key Wane, London on da Track, Metro Boomin, Rick Steel, Southside, Tariq Beats, The Mekanics, Trakformaz and Wess.

Track listing 

Notes

 "Old Man Wildin'" features uncredited vocals by Manolo Rose.
 "Lockjaw" and "Figure It Out" are also included on his canceled second studio album MC4.
 "Man of My City" features uncredited vocals by K Camp.
 "Sanctuary Part II" features uncredited vocals and sampling by Hikaru Utada.

References 

2016 mixtape albums
French Montana albums
Albums produced by Metro Boomin
Albums produced by DJ Khalil
Albums produced by Key Wane
Albums produced by Harry Fraud
Albums produced by Travis Scott
Albums produced by 88-Keys